Lviv Dormition Brotherhood also known as Lviv Stauropegion  Brotherhood was an influential religious organization associated with the Dormition Church in Lviv and one of the oldest Brotherhood Orthodox organizations. It was first an association of Orthodox and then, from 1708, also Greek Catholic burghers in Lviv. Like other brotherhoods in Ukraine, it is also a military force tasked with defending the Orthodox church and the faith, particularly against Polish and Latin influences.

Overview 
The organization possessed stauropegion rights and oversaw not only activities of its secular members, but also clergy and sometimes bishops. Members of any estate had a chance to join the brotherhood. Money contributed to the society were used to fund Monastery and church of St. Onuphrius and Dormition Church. With the help of the brotherhood, Lviv Orthodox eparchy which was liquidated by the Kingdom of Poland after annexation of Galicia (part of Galicia–Volhynia Wars) was revived in 1539.

Lviv Dormition Brotherhood had its own publishing house, operated hospitals, orphanages, elderly homes and provided other community services. It also founded a school in 1585 and campaigned against clerics who neglect their religious duties. It was also a military force that fought the Polish and Latin influences although it capitulated to the latter, subsequently joining Unia or the Eastern Catholic Churches in the eighteenth century.

Its first recorded organizational statute was approved by Patriarch of Antioch Joachim VI in 1586.

In 1708 it finally accepted the Union of Brest.

Following the partitions of Poland, in 1788 the Austrian authorities liquidated the organizations which was reformed into the Stauropegion Institute.

In 1989 Lviv Dormition Brotherhood was revived on the efforts of Volodymyr Yarema who at that time was a priest of the Moscow's Patriarchate Church of Peter and Paul. Since fall of the Soviet Union, it is associated with Ukrainian Autocephalous Orthodox Church.

See also
 Monastery and church of St. Onuphrius, Lviv
 Ivan Fyodorov (printer), Konstanty Korniakt

References

Further reading
 Isaievych Ia. Volunatary Brotherland: Confraternities of Laymen in Early Modern Ukraine. Edmonton–Toronto, 2006

External links
 Lviv Dormition Brotherhood in the Encyclopedia of Ukraine
 Lviv Dormition Brotherhood in the Historical Dictionary of Ukraine
 Lviv Regional Stauropegion Brotherhood official website
 Isaievych, Ya. Lviv Brotherhood. Encyclopedia of History of Ukraine.

Christian organizations based in Ukraine
15th-century Christianity
16th-century Christianity
17th-century Christianity
History of Christianity in Ukraine
Brotherhood (Orthodox lay societies)
Ukrainian Autocephalous Orthodox Church